The 2018–19 season was the second season of competitive football played by Jamshedpur.

Background

The 2017–18 season was Jamshedpur's first ever season after they were awarded one of two expansion slots into the Indian Super League. After winning the expansion slot, the club announced the signing of their first head coach, Steve Coppell. The club then went on the assemble their inaugural season squad, bringing in India international Anas Edathodika as their first player and the Spanish defender, Tiri, as their first foreign player.

Jamshedpur played their first game on 18 November 2017 against NorthEast United. Despite being down a man due to a sending off, the club managed to hold on for a 0–0 draw. The club then played their first match at home on 1 December against ATK, which turned out to be another 0–0 draw. Throughout the season, scoring goals was a problem for Jamshedpur, with Coppell stating at the halfway mark of the campaign that scoring goals was "a big priority for us". Despite that, Jamshedpur would go on to end the season in fifth, one place below a finals spot, with only 16 goals scored, tied second-lowest in the league in that category.

Squad changes
Less than a week after their last match of the 2017–18 ISL season, Jamshedpur confirmed their first signing for the next season as Chennai City midfielder Michael Soosairaj. The club then announced that they had retained goalkeeper Subrata Pal, defenders Tiri, Yumnam Raju, midfielders Memo, Wellington Priori, Bikash Jairu, and forwards Farukh Choudhary and Sumeet Passi. Then, on 17 April 2018, the club announced their second signing, defender Pratik Chaudhari of Delhi Dynamos. Nine days later, the club announced their third signing, goalkeeper Subhasish Roy Chowdhary of Kerala Blasters.

In

Pre-season and friendlies
Jamshedpur FC departed for Madrid, Spain on 14 August 2018 to take part in the pre-season camp. The team will be playing five practice matches in the duration of a month-long tour.
The team will be training at the Los Ángeles de San Rafael facility in Spain. This training facility is famous for hosting the preseason for La Liga giants Atlético de Madrid.
The team will be playing practice matches during the preseason with teams such as Atlético Madrid B , Gimnástica Segoviana CF, Torrelodones C.F., CD Móstoles URJC. etc which majorly are from second and third division of Spain.

Competitions

Indian Super League

Table

Player statistics

Goalscorers

See also
 2018–19 in Indian football
 Jamshedpur FC

References

Jamshedpur FC seasons
2018–19 Indian Super League season by team